Route 4 is a  long, two-lane uncontrolled access secondary highway in eastern Prince Edward Island, Canada. In runs east from the Trans-Canada Highway (Route 1) at Wood Islands along the Northumberland Straight to Route 18 the settlement of High Bank, where it turns north and passes through Murray River and Montague before ending at Route 2 at Dingwells Mills.

Names 
Route 4 has several local names:
 Shore Road (Wood Islands to High Bank)
 Normans Road (High Bank to Murray River)
 Commercial Road (Murray River to Montague)
 A.A. Macdonald Highway (Montague to Pooles Corner)
 Alleys Mill Road (Pooles Corner to Cardigan)
 Seven Mile Road (Cardigan to Dundas)
 Dundas Road (Dundas to Dingwells Mills)

Major intersections 
From south to north:

References

004
004
004